Wickiup Reservoir is the second-largest reservoir in the U.S. state of Oregon. Wickiup Reservoir is close to the Twin Lakes, Davis Lake, Crane Prairie Reservoir, Cultus Lake, and Little Cultus Lake. The reservoir is located within the Deschutes National Forest and the Fort Rock Ranger District, near the Cascade Lakes Scenic Byway.

Like nearby Crane Prairie Reservoir, Wickiup Reservoir was created by damming of the Deschutes River. The Wickiup Dam was built in 1949 by the United States Bureau of Reclamation for the "Deschutes Project" and "Pringle Falls Experimental Forest", which is used for education and research. Other nearby dams include the Crane Prairie Dam and the Haystack Dam. The Deschutes River, which originates at Little Lava Lake, is an inflow and an outflow of Wickiup Reservoir.

Because of this, fishing is very popular in the lake, especially for brown trout. Wickiup Reservoir is dubbed as the best lake for brown trout fishing in the state.

According to the United States Forest Service, Wickiup Reservoir is one of Central Oregon's best wildlife viewing areas. Some of the nature that thrives in the area include waterfowl, shorebirds, hoofed mammals, ponderosa pine, and lodgepole pine.

Also at Wickiup Reservoir are several recreation options. There are six campgrounds on site, all of which include a boat ramp, toilets and water.

On August 12, 2009, the Oregon Department of Human Services issued a health advisory due to a large algae bloom. They mentioned that "drinking water from Wickiup Reservoir was dangerous, even if boiled or treated" and that anyone who relies on the water from the lake should find an alternate source.

See also
List of lakes in Oregon

References

External links
, a smaller reservoir west of the Warner Valley
Historic American Engineering Record (HAER) documentation, filed under Deschutes River, La Pine, Deschutes County, OR:

Reservoirs in Oregon
Lakes of Deschutes County, Oregon
Buildings and structures in Deschutes County, Oregon
Protected areas of Deschutes County, Oregon
Deschutes National Forest
1949 establishments in Oregon
Historic American Engineering Record in Oregon